Sheikh's Castaway is the eighth book in Alexandra Sellers's Sons of the Desert series, and was released in 2004. After learning she had been lied to and betrayed by her fiancé Bari, Princess Noor from Bagestan escapes from her own wedding, still dressed in her elaborate gown. In a reckless attempt to disappear and flee her imminent marriage, Noor hijacks her fiancé's airplane, flying it straight into a tropical storm. Unbeknownst to her, Bari has hidden himself in the aircraft, and only makes his presence known in an attempt to save themselves just before they crash-land off the coast of a deserted island. 

Bari is determined to take advantage of their situation as castaways on a remote island so he can teach his reckless fiancée a lesson of humility and survival. As their time on the island stretches from hours into days, it serves as a learning experience for both of them.

Reviews
 Review at RT Book Reviews

References

External links
 Sheikh's Castaway on Author Website

British romance novels
Harlequin books
2004 British novels